The Thirteenth Amendment may refer to the:

Thirteenth Amendment to the United States Constitution, which abolished slavery and involuntary servitude, except as punishment for a crime
Thirteenth Amendment to the Constitution of Pakistan, which stripped the president of many of his reserve powers
Thirteenth Amendment of the Constitution of Ireland, which specified that the prohibition on abortion would not limit freedom of travel
Thirteenth Amendment of the Constitution of South Africa, which re-enacted provisions of the Twelfth Amendment
Thirteenth Amendment to the Constitution of Sri Lanka, which created Provincial Councils in Sri Lanka